Joseph Riordan may refer to:

 Joe Riordan (1930–2012), Australian politician and government minister
 Joseph W. Riordan (1816–1897), Santa Clara University president